Majosháza is a village in Pest county, Budapest metropolitan area, Hungary. It has a population of 1,365 (2007).

Twin towns - twin cities
  Aita Medie – Romania
  Biržai – Lithuania

References

Populated places in Pest County